Sangil-dong station is the subway station of Line 5 in Gangdong-gu, Seoul. Seoul Metro have extended the subway line from this station to Hanam Geomdansan in the nearby city of Hanam.

The South Korean government plans to build a new apartment complex roughly 2 million pyeong in size.

Station layout

Vicinity
Exit 1 : Godeok Lifelong Learning Center, Godeok 2-dong Community Service Center, Jugong Apts. Complex 2, 8
Exit 2 : Saemaeul Market, Jugong Apts. Complex 2
Exit 3 : Goil Elementary School, Kodeok Sports Center, Korea Welfare Center for the visually handicapped, Jugong Apts. Complex 3, 5, 6
Exit 4 : Godeok Post Office, Godeok Police Box, Jugong Apts. Complex 3, 4, 7

Ridership

References

Railway stations opened in 1995
Metro stations in Gangdong District
Seoul Metropolitan Subway stations